District 9 is a 2009 science fiction thriller film directed by Neill Blomkamp. The National Board of Review has named it one of the top 10 independent film of 2009. It received four Academy Awards nominations, seven British Academy Film Awards nominations, five Broadcast Film Critics Association nominations, and one Golden Globe nomination. It is the fourth film ever nominated for Best Picture at the Academy Awards for TriStar Pictures.

Awards and nominations

Organizations

Guild awards

Critics groups

References

External links
 

Lists of accolades by film